Gilles Daniel Mbang Ondo (born 10 October 1985) is a Gabonese footballer who plays for Þróttur Vogum in the 1. deild karla.

Personal life
Gilles shares a dual-citizenship between Gabon and France. His younger brother, Loïc Mbang Ondo plays for Icelandic club, Kórdrengir.

Club career

Youth career
Born in Libreville, Gabon, Gilles, when he was 10 months old, moved along with his family to Paris, France. He began his footballing career in 1995 at the age of 9 with Sens-based, FC Sens. In 1999, he moved back to Paris where he began playing for the Paris Saint-Germain Academy till 2003. He then moved to Auxerre, where he played for the U-18 and U-21 teams of Ligue 1 club, AJ Auxerre. He also made an appearance for the Auxerre-based club's reserve squad in the 2005–06 season of Championnat de France Amateur and helped his side secure the 3rd position in the Group A of the competition.

Eisenstadt
Gilles first moved out of France in 2007 to Austria where on 1 July 2007, he signed a six-month contract with Austrian Regional League club, SC Eisenstadt. He scored 4 goals in 13 appearances in the 2007–08 season of the Austrian Regional League for the Eisenstadt-based club.

Grindavík
In 2008, he again made a move out of France and this time to Iceland where on 1 January 2008, he signed a three-year contract with Úrvalsdeild karla club, Grindavík. He scored his first Úrvalsdeild goal on 27 July 2008 in a 5–3 loss against Valur. He scored 3 goals in 9 appearances in the 2008 Úrvalsdeild.

He made his first appearance and scored his first goal in the 2009 Úrvalsdeild on 10 May 2009 in a 3–1 loss against Stjarnan. He also made his debut and scored his first goal in the Icelandic Cup on 18 June 2009 in the Third Round of the 2009 Icelandic Cup in a 3–1 win over Íþróttabandalag Akraness. All the three goals for the Grindavík-based club came from Gilles. He scored 11 goals in 21 appearances in the 2009 Úrvalsdeild and thus winning the Grindavík Player of the Year award in 2009.

In the 2010 Úrvalsdeild, he made his first appearance on 11 May 2010 in a 4–0 loss against Stjarnan and scored his first goal on 25 May 2010 in a 2–1 loss against Valur. He also made an appearance in the Fourth Round of the 2010 Icelandic Cup on 24 June 2010 in a 1–1 draw against Knattspyrnufélag Akureyrar which was later won by the Akureyri-based club 5–4 on penalties. Gilles successfully converted the fourth penalty for his side in the penalty shootout but his side failed to pull out a win against Akureyri-based club. He scored 14 goals in 20 appearances in the 2010 Úrvalsdeild, thus finishing as the top scorer of the 2010 edition of the first-tier Iceland and sharing the award with, Iceland internationals, Alfreð Finnbogason and Atli Viðar Björnsson and also ending his three-year long spell with the Grindavík-based club. He also won the Grindavík Player of the Year award for a second consecutive year in a row and also received the Player of the Year Award from the Football Association of Iceland in his final season with the Grindavík-based club.

Stabæk
In 2011, he moved to Norway where on 1 January 2011, he signed a one-year contract with Bærum-based, Stabæk Football Club. He made his Tippeligaen debut on 20 March 2011 in a 7–0 loss against Lillestrøm SK and scored his first goal on 3 April 2011 in a 2–1 win over Rosenborg BK. He also made his Norwegian Football Cup debut on 1 May 2011 in the First Round of the competition in a 1–0 win over Holmlia SK. He scored 1 goal in 3 appearances in the 2011 Norwegian Football Cup and 4 goals in 25 appearances in the 2011 Tippeligaen for the Bærum-based club.

Sandnes Ulf
On 1 January 2012, he signed a six-month contract with another Tippeligaen club, Sandnes Ulf. He made his first appearance for the club and scored his first goal on 26 March 2012 in a 2–2 draw against Viking FK. He scored 2 goals in 13 appearances in the 2012 Tippeligaen.

Al-Nejmeh
In January 2013, he again moved out of France and this time to West Asia and more accurately to Lebanon where he signed a six-month contract with Al-Nejmeh SC. He made his Lebanese Premier League debut and scored his first goal on 16 February 2013 in a 3–2 win over Shabab Al-Ghazieh. He scored 4 goals in 9 appearances in the 2012–13 Lebanese Premier League and helped his side secure the 2nd position in the competition and also helped them earn a spot in the 2014 AFC Cup.

Al-Taawon
In late 2013, he again made a move out of France and this time to the Middle East and more accurately to the United Arab Emirates where he signed a one-year contract with Ras al-Khaimah-based, Al-Taawon C.S. Club. He made his UAE First Division debut and scored his first goal on 9 November 2013 in a 6–1 loss against Fujairah-based, Al-Oruba. He scored 15 goals in 21 appearances in the 2013–14 edition of the competition which also included a hat-trick on 20 March 2014 in a 3–0 win over Al-Rams Club.

Ras Al-Khaimah
He then moved to another UAE First Division and Ras al-Khaimah-based club, Ras Al-Khaimah. He made his club debut in a UAE League Cup match on 11 October 2014 in a 4–1 loss against Dubai-based, Dubai CSC and scored his first goal on 31 October 2014 in a 2–1 loss against Al-Thaid in the same competition. He made his first appearance in the 2014–15 UAE First Division on 15 November 2014 in a 2–0 loss against Al-Shaab CSC and scored his first goal in the 2014–15 edition of the competition on 22 November 2014 in a 1–1 draw against Dibba Club. He scored 1 goal in 3 appearances in the 2014–15 UAE Arabian Gulf Cup and 3 goals in 9 appearances in the 2014–15 UAE First Division for the Ras al-Khaimah-based club.

Dibba Al-Hisn
In January 2015, he moved to Dibba Al-Hisn where he signed a six-month contract with another UAE First Division club, Dibba Al-Hisn Sports Club. He made his club debut and scored his first goal on 20 February 2015 in a 2–2 draw against Masafi Club. He scored 5 goals in 10 appearances in the 2014–15 UAE First Division for the Dibba Al-Hisn-based club and thus took his tally to 8 goals in the 2014–15 edition of the competition.

Al-Nahda
In September 2015, he again made a move out of France to the Middle East and this time to Oman where on 22 September 2015, he signed a one-year contract with Al-Nahda Club. He made his debut for the club on 1 October 2015 in a 2–0 win over Al-Khaboura SC in the 2015–16 Oman Professional League Cup and scored his first goal in the same competition on 11 October 2015 in a 4–3 win over Sohar SC. He made his Oman Professional League and scored his first goal in the competition on debut on 18 October 2015 in a 2–1 win over Muscat Club.

Þróttur Vogum
After one season with UMF Selfoss, he joined Þróttur Vogum in April 2019.

International career

Gilles is part of the first team squad of the Gabon national football team. He was selected for the national team for the first time in 2007. He made his debut and scored his first goal for the Black Panthers in a friendly match on 12 June 2007 in a 3–0 win over Réunion. He made his FIFA official debut for the national side in a 2010 FIFA World Cup qualification match on 7 September 2008 in a 3–0 win over Lesotho.

Career statistics

Club

International goals
Scores and results list Gabon's goal tally first.

Honours

Club
Al-Nejmeh
Lebanese Premier League: Runner-up 2012–13

Individual
Úrvalsdeild top scorer: 2010
Úrvalsdeild Player of the Year: 2010
Grindavík Player of the Year : 2009, 2010

References

External links
 
 
 Gilles Mbang Ondo - fanet.ae 	
 Gilles Mbang Ondo (Iceland) - YouTube	
 Gilles Mbang Ondo (Norway) - YouTube	
 Gilles Mbang Ondo (Lebanon) - YouTube	
 Gilles Mbang Ondo (UAE) - YouTube	
 Gilles Mbang Ondo - YouTube	
 Gilles Mbang Ondo - YouTube	
 Gilles Mbang Ondo - YouTube	
 Gilles Mbang Ondo - YouTube	
 Gilles Mbang Ondo Official Blog 	

1985 births
Living people
Sportspeople from Libreville
Gabonese footballers
Gabon international footballers
Gabonese expatriate footballers
Association football forwards
Paris Saint-Germain F.C. players
AJ Auxerre players
Stabæk Fotball players
Grindavík men's football players
Sandnes Ulf players
Nejmeh SC players
Ras Al Khaimah Club players
Al-Taawon (UAE) Club players
Dibba Al-Hisn Sports Club players
Al-Nahda Club (Oman) players
UE Engordany players
Gilles Mbang Ondo
Gilles Mbang Ondo
Eliteserien players
Oman Professional League players
UAE First Division League players
Primera Divisió players
2. deild karla players
Expatriate footballers in France
Gabonese expatriate sportspeople in France
Expatriate footballers in Iceland
Gabonese expatriate sportspeople in Iceland
Expatriate footballers in Norway
Gabonese expatriate sportspeople in Norway
Expatriate footballers in Lebanon
Gabonese expatriate sportspeople in Lebanon
Expatriate footballers in the United Arab Emirates
Gabonese expatriate sportspeople in the United Arab Emirates
Expatriate footballers in Oman
Gabonese expatriate sportspeople in Oman
Austrian Regionalliga players
Vestri (football club) players
Lebanese Premier League players
21st-century Gabonese people
Þróttur Vogum players